In mathematics, the cyclic category or cycle category or category of cycles is a category  of finite cyclically ordered sets and  degree-1 maps between them.

Definition

The cyclic category Λ has one object Λn for each natural number n = 0, 1, 2, ...

The morphisms from Λm to Λn are represented by increasing functions f from the integers to the integers, such that f(x+m+1) = f(x)+n+1, where two functions f and g represent the same morphism when their difference is divisible by n+1.

Informally, the morphisms from Λm to Λn can be thought of as maps of (oriented) 
necklaces with m+1 and n+1 beads. More precisely, the morphisms can be identified with homotopy classes of degree 1 increasing maps from S1 to itself that map the subgroup Z/(m+1)Z to Z/(n+1)Z.

Properties

The number of morphisms from Λm to Λn is (m+n+1)!/m!n!.

The cyclic category is self dual.

The classifying space BΛ of the cyclic category is a classifying space BS1of the circle group S1.

Cyclic sets

A cyclic set is a contravariant functor from the cyclic category to sets. More generally a cyclic object in a category C is a contravariant functor from the cyclic category to C.

See also
Cyclic homology
Simplex category

References

External links
Cycle category in nLab

Categories in category theory
Homology theory